Kakapir is a fishing village in Karachi Harbour, 15 kilometers to the west of Karachi, Pakistan. It is located at the western end of Sandspit Beach, near Hawke's Bay Beach. Mauripur lies to its north. Kakapir is named for a saint, whose shrine is located in the village, who reportedly was known for his brown hair. "Kaka" is the local word for brown, while "Pir" means saint. The village is reportedly about 100 years old.  Residents of the village were originally from the Mithadar and Kharadar neighborhoods of Karachi, who were settled by the British in Shams Pir during the construction of the Port of Karachi. Those residents migrated further west and established Kakapir.

Ethnically, the population is mostly Sindhis and Laasi, who claim to be descendants of the original indigenous inhabitants of Karachi and the Sindh coast. It had an estimated 600 residents in 2005. Prior to construction of Manora Road in 1952, men from other villages could settle in Kakapir only if they married within the village. The village is in the midst of mangrove forests, which locals report are being cut down by criminal groups.

References

External links
 Kakapir Fisherfolk Development Organization
 Study of Kaka Pir village - World Wildlife Fund

Neighbourhoods of Karachi
Fishing communities